XHKE-FM is a radio station on 104.5 FM in Navojoa, Sonora. It is owned by Uniradio and carries a grupera format under the KE 104.5 FM name.

History
XEKE-AM 980 received its concession on May 15, 1956. By the 2000s, it was owned by Joaquín Santiago Terminel Urrea; XEKE was sold to Uniradio in 2005.

XEKE migrated to FM in 2011 as XHKE-FM 104.5.

References

Regional Mexican radio stations
Radio stations in Sonora
Radio stations established in 1956
Mass media in Navojoa
1956 establishments in Mexico